Yves Daudigny (born 23 February 1947) is a French politician and member of the Senate of France.  He represents the Aisne départment, in Picardy, and is a member of the Socialist Party.

Daudigny is best known for his proposal to introduce a controversial 300% tax increase on palm oil, dubbed "the Nutella Tax" by the media because palm oil is one of the main ingredients in Nutella.

Notes

References
Page on the Senate website

1947 births
Living people
French Senators of the Fifth Republic
Socialist Party (France) politicians
Senators of Aisne
People from Aisne
Politicians from Hauts-de-France